Éliane Amado Levy-Valensi (May 11, 1919 – May 10, 2006) was a French-Israeli psychologist, psychoanalyst and philosopher.

Biography

Éliane Levy-Valensi was born in Marseille to a Jewish family. In 1930 she moved with her parents to Saint-Mandé (Val-de-Marne) near Paris.

She studied philosophy. She admitted the Centre national de la recherche scientifique (CNRS), preparing her doctoral thesis. She taught philosophy at the Sorbonne

In 1968 she emigrated to Israel, and became a professor of philosophy at Bar-Ilan University.

Family
She married Max Amado in 1942 and divorced from him in 1953. In 1960 she married Claude Veil, a psychiatrist and professor, and divorced from him in 1969.

Books
 Le Dialogue psychanalytique : Les rapports intersubjectifs en psychanalyse, la vocation du sujet, 1962
 Les Niveaux de l'être : La connaissance et le mal, 1963
 Le Temps dans la vie psychologique, 1964
 La Communication, 1967
 Le Temps dans la vie morale, 1968
 Isaac gardien de son frère ? : Implications inconscientes du dialogue israélo-arabe, 1968
 La Racine et la source : Essais sur la judaïsme, 1968
 Les voies et les pièges de la psychanalyse, 1971
 Le Grand désarroi : Aux sources de l'énigme homosexuelle, 1973
 La nature de la pensée inconsciente, 1978
 La Onzième épreuve d'Abraham ou De la Fraternité, 1981
 Lettres de Jerusalem, 1983
 Le Moïse de Freud, ou, La référence occultée, 1984
 Job : réponse à Jung, 1991
 La nevrose plurielle, 1992
 La dignité des mots, 1995
 La Poétique du Zohar, 1996
 Penser ou/et rêver: Mécanismes et objectifs de la pensée en Occident et dans le Judaïsme, 1997
 L'Imagination : Philosophie et tradition juive, 1998
 La nature de la pensée inconsciente, 1999

References

External links

 Prof. Levy-Valensi in The Department of Jewish Philosophy, Bar-Ilan University

French psychologists
French women psychologists
Israeli psychologists
Israeli women psychologists
Jewish philosophers
1919 births
2006 deaths
Israeli people of French-Jewish descent
French women philosophers
Israeli women philosophers
French emigrants to Israel
20th-century French philosophers
20th-century French Jews
20th-century Israeli philosophers
20th-century French psychologists
20th-century French women
Writers from Marseille